Eagle Broadcasting Corporation (EBC) is a Filipino Media company based in Diliman, Quezon City, Philippines. Named after the national bird, the Philippine eagle, it is primarily involved in radio and television broadcasting. The primary stakeholders of the company are the key members who are connected with the Iglesia ni Cristo, making EBC as one of its media companies, along with evangelization arm Christian Era Broadcasting Service International. Its head office and studios are located at no. 25 Central Avenue, New Era, Quezon City.

History

On April 26, 1968, Eagle Broadcasting Corporation was established with its AM station DZEC. Over the next few years, it expanded its coverage by putting up relay stations in Dagupan, Lucena, Cebu & Davao. In 1973, it ventured into FM with DZBU, which later on changed its call letters to DWDM in 1981. It was during the height of EDSA III in 2001 when DZEC adapted the "Radyo Agila" branding.

On April 23, 2000, Eagle Broadcasting Corporation launched a multimedia exhibit dubbed "Destination: PLANET 25", for a station previously owned by ACWS-United Broadcasting Network under the name UltraVision 25 and it was later acquired by EBC and it was renamed as Net 25. Capable of 120 kilowatts of transmitter power (for a total of 7,896 kilowatts ERP), Net 25 boasts of the Philippines' first trilon TV tower that rises to 907 feet above sea level. A JAMPRO 48-panel antenna and two 60 kW Acrodyne transmitters complete the tower package. NET 25 also has studios and editing suites for in-house and post-productions. Now Net 25 airs nationwide on 26 free TV stations in Manila and all over the Philippines as well as cable affiliates.

It was recently relaunched last August 7, 2011. As part of the relaunch, it also launched the Eagle Bayan Careavan. Livestreaming features of Net 25 (and its radio station DZEC) returned last January 2, 2014 after a 5-year hiatus.

On February 12, 2013, EBC inaugurated its own broadcast center along Central Avenue, Quezon City, Metro Manila. the event was attended by Iglesia ni Cristo Executive Minister Eduardo Manalo together with EBC's top officials.

On October 31, 2013, it launched its news website and online portal which features news and features from all over the world, including reports from its correspondents in the Philippines and in other countries.

On October 31, 2016, as part of the EBC's worldwide expansion, the network was registered as a duty authorized and accredited media outfit in the District of Columbia, United States of America.

EBC's Washington Bureau in fact, took the lead, in broadcasting the US elections on November 8, 2016.

On October 31, 2017, EBC launched its first ever film, Guerrero, directed by Carlo Ortega Cuevas who had previously won awards for the film, Walang Take Two. Cuevas also directed EBC's first sit-com, Hapi ang Buhay, and its movie sequel which was premiered on September 21, 2018.

Legislative Franchise Renewal
On May 3, 2016, Philippine President Benigno C. Aquino III signed Republic Act No. 10773 which renewed EBC's legislative franchise for another 25 years. The law granted EBC a franchise to construct, install, operate, and maintain, for commercial purposes, radio broadcasting stations and television stations, including digital television system, with the corresponding facilities such as relay stations, throughout the Philippines.

Television stations

Net 25 Nationwide

Analog

Digital

Net 25 on Pay TV & Cable Television

Radio stations

FM Stations

AM Stations

Affiliate stations

Other Subsidiaries
EBC Films
E25 Records
Eagle News

References

1968 establishments in the Philippines
Companies based in Quezon City
Mass media companies established in 1968
Radio stations in the Philippines
Television in Metro Manila
Television networks in the Philippines
Iglesia ni Cristo
Privately held companies of the Philippines
Religious television stations in the Philippines